Saints Theodore Tyro and Theodore Stratelates Church, or commonly known Saints Theodoroi (Greek: Άγιοι Θεόδωροι) is the old Byzantine Cathedral of the city of Serres in northern Greece.

It was built in 1124 and is dedicated to Theodore of Amasea (Tyro) and Theodore Stratelates.

Gallery

References

Buildings and structures in Serres
Byzantine church buildings in Central Macedonia
Churches completed in 1124
12th-century establishments in the Byzantine Empire
12th-century churches in Greece